Romeo "Romy" Queddeng Pastrana (born October 5, 1958), professionally known as Dagul, is a Filipino actor, comedian, and politician best known for being a host of the children's sketch program Goin' Bulilit. He has dwarfism.

Acting career
Romy Pastrana was scouted by singer-host Randy Santiago in 1998. Santiago would later dub him as "Dagul" which is a colloquial term in Pampanga meaning tall or big which contrasts his short height.

From doing smaller roles in movies such as Isprikitik, Walastik Kung Pumitik (1999) and Juan & Ted: Wanted (2000), Dagul gained even more exposure when he became Long Mejia's sparring partner in GMA's defunct comedy sitcom Kool Ka Lang (2001).

Viewers already appreciated the "Long and Dagul" tandem when the former decided to transfer to ABS-CBN. Dagul followed. Long Mejia became a regular co-host of Willie Revillame's Masayang Tanghali Bayan, while Dagul did some guest appearances.

Soon the tandem split up. Long was included in the cast of Home Alone da River (2002) and Home Along Da Airport (2003) and became preoccupied with doing movies. Dagul, on the other hand, became more visible on TV. He was a mainstay of the defunct sitcom Ok Fine Whatever (2003) and, up to now, a regular defunct in Goin' Bulilit.

Dagul is the only adult in the hit children's Sunday gag show defunct, Goin' Bulilit since its inception. Director Edgar Mortiz was responsible for giving Dagul regular employment by casting him in the show. Unlike the other child cast from the show Dagul will never "graduate".

Dagul returned to GMA 7 via his comeback project, Victor Magtanggoll with co-stars Alden Richards and Coney Reyes.

Filmography

Television
Kool Ka Lang (1998–2002 / GMA Network)
Ok Fine Whatever (2003 / ABS-CBN)
Maalaala Mo Kaya: Stuffed Toy (2003 /  ABS-CBN)
Masayang Tanghali Bayan (2003–2004 / ABS-CBN)
Yes Yes Show (2004–2005 / ABS-CBN)
Goin' Bulilit (2005–2019 / ABS-CBN)
Victor Magtanggol (2018 / GMA Network)
Magpakailanman: Ang Dakilang Kong Ama (2022 / GMA Network)

Film
Corazon: Ang Unang Aswang (2012) 
Sakal, Sakali, Saklolo (2007)
Mr. Suave (2003)
Cass & Cary: Who Wants to Be a Billionaire? (2002)
D'Uragons: Never Umuurong, Always Sumusulong (2002)
Burlesk King Daw, O! (2000)
Juan & Ted: Wanted - Chuck (2000)
Isprikitik, Walastik Kung Pumitik (1999)
Yes Darling: Walang Matigas Na Pulis 2 (1997)

Politics
In October 2010, Dagul was proclaimed kagawad of Barangay San Jose in Rodriguez, Rizal after receiving the highest number of votes for the position. He campaigned himself as "The Little Man With a Big Heart" and promised to put up daycare centers and deploy additional medical personnel in poor areas if he was elected to the position. 

And on 29 March 2019, Dagul left "Goin' Bulilit"; to run for public office.

Personal life 
As of February 2013, Dagul is married and has four children, three of which are sons, and a daughter. All of Dagul's children, except his only daughter who is also the youngest child, did not inherit his dwarfism condition.

See also
Weng Weng

References

External links

1958 births
Living people
People from Rodriguez, Rizal
Actors with dwarfism
Filipino people with disabilities
Filipino actor-politicians
Filipino male comedians
Filipino male film actors
Filipino male television actors
Male actors from Negros Occidental
Members of Iglesia ni Cristo

GMA Network personalities
ABS-CBN personalities